"Hello, My Name Is" is a song written and performed by contemporary Christian musician, Matthew West. It was released as the second single from his 2012 album, Into the Light, on July 10, 2012. The song became his fifth No. 1 on the Hot Christian Songs chart. It stayed there for seventeen weeks.

Book
An official book inspired by the song was published on April 18, 2017 by West. West wrote the book as a sign to "tear off the false name tags that cover up your true identity" and understand who you are as a person. West reflected on what it means to release the book in an interview with CBN:

West wanted to write the book to tell all of his past mistakes and issues, while also trying to show relation to the reader.

Music video
A lyric video for the song was released on March 22, 2013. After asking for fans to send him requests for inspiration on his songs, West features the voice of Jordan, a man was dealing with a drug addiction. In the live version of the song, West explained Jordan's story:

The rest of the video features West performing the song live.

Charts

Weekly charts

Year-end charts

Decade-end charts

Certifications

References 

2013 singles
Matthew West songs
Songs written by Matthew West
2012 songs
Sparrow Records singles